National Route 446 is a national highway of Japan connecting Hyuga, Miyazaki and Yunomae, Kumamoto in Japan, with a total length of 103.3 km (64.2 mi).

References

National highways in Japan
Roads in Kumamoto Prefecture
Roads in Miyazaki Prefecture